Outside The Box is Vicki Genfan's first available release and features both instrumental and vocal songs. It gained wide recognition and was highly acclaimed by critics. The song "New Grass", a fast ride on slapping and tapping changing between odd meters like 7/4 and plain 6/4 or 4/4, won the Just Plain Folks Award in 2001 in the category of best solo instrumental.

Track listing
All songs by Vicki Genfan, except "Amazing Grace" (Traditional)
 Catch Me
 Outside the Box
 Impossinova
 Mother's Day
 Offerings
 New Grass
 Why don't love sit still
 Interlude
 In a Mood
 Don't Give Up
 Amazing Grace

Personnel
Vicki Genfan - acoustic guitar, bass guitar, percussion, vocals
Danny Wilensky - flute, soprano sax
Tay Hoyle, Vicki Genfan - producer
Tay Hoyle - engineering and mixing
Steve Kadison, Ellen Fitton - mastering

References

External links
Audio samples and review at CD Baby

2000 albums
Vicki Genfan albums